Zygophyllales is an order of dicotyledonous flowering plants. The anthophytes are a grouping of plant taxa bearing flower-like reproductive structures. They were formerly thought to be a clade comprising plants bearing flower-like structures.  The group contained the angiosperms - the extant flowering plants, such as roses and grasses - as well as the Gnetales and the extinct Bennettitales.

23,420 species of vascular plant have been recorded in South Africa, making it the sixth most species-rich country in the world and the most species-rich country on the African continent. Of these, 153 species are considered to be threatened. Nine biomes have been described in South Africa: Fynbos, Succulent Karoo, desert, Nama Karoo, grassland, savanna, Albany thickets, the Indian Ocean coastal belt, and forests.

The 2018 South African National Biodiversity Institute's National Biodiversity Assessment plant checklist lists 35,130 taxa in the phyla Anthocerotophyta (hornworts (6)), Anthophyta (flowering plants (33534)), Bryophyta (mosses (685)), Cycadophyta (cycads (42)), Lycopodiophyta (Lycophytes(45)), Marchantiophyta (liverworts (376)), Pinophyta (conifers (33)), and Pteridophyta (cryptogams (408)).

One family is represented in the literature. Listed taxa include species, subspecies, varieties, and forms as recorded, some of which have subsequently been allocated to other taxa as synonyms, in which cases the accepted taxon is appended to the listing. Multiple entries under alternative names reflect taxonomic revision over time.

Zygophyllaceae
Family: Zygophyllaceae,

Augea
Genus Augea:
 Augea capensis Thunb. indigenous, indigenous

Balanites
Genus Balanites:
 Balanites maughamii Sprague, indigenous, indigenous
 Balanites maughamii Sprague subsp. Maughamii indigenous, indigenous
 Balanites pedicellaris Mildbr. & Schltr. Indigenous, indigenous, indigenous
 Balanites pedicellaris Mildbr. & Schltr. subsp. Pedicellaris, indigenous, indigenous
 Balanites welwitschii (Tiegh.) Exell & Mendonça, accepted as Balanites angolensis (Welw.) Welw. ex Mildbr. & Schltr. subsp. welwitschii (Tiegh.) Sands

Fagonia
Genus Fagonia:
 Fagonia capensis Hadidi, indigenous, indigenous
 Fagonia isotricha Murb.  Indigenous, indigenous
 Fagonia isotricha Murb. var. isotricha, indigenous

Roepera
Genus Roepera:
 Roepera botulifolia (Van Zyl) Beier & Thulin, indigenous
 Roepera cordifolia (L.f.) Beier & Thulin, indigenous
 Roepera cuneifolia (Eckl. & Zeyh.) Beier & Thulin, indigenous
 Roepera debilis (Cham.) Beier & Thulin, indigenous
 Roepera divaricata (Eckl. & Zeyh.) Beier & Thulin, indigenous
 Roepera flexuosa (Eckl. & Zeyh.) Beier & Thulin, indigenous
 Roepera foetida (Schrad. & J.C.Wendl.) Beier & Thulin, indigenous
 Roepera fulva (L.) Beier & Thulin, indigenous
 Roepera fuscata (Van Zyl) Beier & Thulin, indigenous
 Roepera horrida (Cham.) Beier & Thulin, indigenous
 Roepera incrustata (Sond.) Beier & Thulin, indigenous
 Roepera leptopetala (Sond.) Beier & Thulin, indigenous
 Roepera leucoclada (Diels) Beier & Thulin, indigenous
 Roepera lichtensteiniana (Cham.) Beier & Thulin, indigenous
 Roepera macrocarpon (Retief) Beier & Thulin, indigenous
 Roepera maculata (Aiton) Beier & Thulin, indigenous
 Roepera maritima (Eckl. & Zeyh.) Beier & Thulin, indigenous
 Roepera microphyllum (L.f.) Beier & Thulin, indigenous
 Roepera morgsana (L.) Beier & Thulin, indigenous
 Roepera pubescens (Schinz) Beier & Thulin, indigenous
 Roepera pygmaea (Eckl. & Zeyh.) Beier & Thulin, indigenous
 Roepera rogersii (Compton) Beier & Thulin, indigenous
 Roepera schreiberi (Merxm. & Giess) Beier & Thulin, indigenous
 Roepera sessilifolia (L.) Beier & Thulin, indigenous
 Roepera sphaerocarpa (Schltr. ex Huysst.) Beier & Thulin, indigenous
 Roepera spinosa (L.) Beier & Thulin, indigenous
 Roepera teretifolia (Schltr.) Beier & Thulin, indigenous

Seetzenia
Genus Seetzenia:
 Seetzenia lanata (Willd.) Bullock, indigenous

Sisyndite
Genus Sisyndite:
 Sisyndite spartea E.Mey. ex Sond. indigenous

Tetraena
Genus Tetraena:
 Tetraena chrysopteron (Retief) Beier & Thulin, indigenous
 Tetraena clavata (Schltr. & Diels) Beier & Thulin, indigenous
 Tetraena decumbens (Delile) Beier & Thulin, indigenous
 Tetraena microcarpa (Licht. ex Cham.) Beier & Thulin, indigenous
 Tetraena prismatocarpa (Sond.) Beier & Thulin, indigenous
 Tetraena pterocaulis (Van Zyl) Beier & Thulin, indigenous
 Tetraena retrofracta (Thunb.) Beier & Thulin, indigenous
 Tetraena rigida (Schinz) Beier & Thulin, indigenous
 Tetraena simplex (L.) Beier & Thulin, indigenous
 Tetraena tenuis (Glover) Beier & Thulin, indigenous

Tribulus
Genus Tribulus:
 Tribulus cristatus C.Presl, indigenous
 Tribulus pterophorus C.Presl, indigenous
 Tribulus terrestris L. indigenous
 Tribulus zeyheri Sond. indigenous
 Tribulus zeyheri Sond. subsp. zeyheri, indigenous

Zygophyllum
Genus Zygophyllum:
 Zygophyllum botulifolium van Zyl, accepted as Roepera botulifolia (Van Zyl) Beier & Thulin, endemic
 Zygophyllum campanulatum Dinter ex Range, accepted as Tetraena longicapsularis (Schinz) Beier & Thulin 
 Zygophyllum chrysopteron Retief, accepted as Tetraena chrysopteron (Retief) Beier & Thulin, indigenous
 Zygophyllum cinereum Schinz, accepted as Tetraena longicapsularis (Schinz) Beier & Thulin 
 Zygophyllum clavatum Schltr. & Diels, accepted as Tetraena clavata (Schltr. & Diels) Beier & Thulin, indigenous
 Zygophyllum cordifolium L.f. accepted as Roepera cordifolia (L.f.) Beier & Thulin, indigenous
 Zygophyllum crassifolium Schltr. ex Huysst. accepted as Roepera cuneifolia (Eckl. & Zeyh.) Beier & Thulin 
 Zygophyllum cuneifolium Eckl. & Zeyh. accepted as Roepera cuneifolia (Eckl. & Zeyh.) Beier & Thulin, endemic
 Zygophyllum debile Cham. & Schltdl. accepted as Roepera debilis (Cham.) Beier & Thulin, endemic
 Zygophyllum decumbens Delile, accepted as Tetraena decumbens (Delile) Beier & Thulin, present
 Zygophyllum densiflorum Schinz, accepted as Zygophyllum dregeanum Sond. 
 Zygophyllum dichotomum Cham. & Schltdl. endemic
 Zygophyllum divaricatum Eckl. & Zeyh. accepted as Roepera divaricata (Eckl. & Zeyh.) Beier & Thulin, endemic
 Zygophyllum dregeanum Sond. indigenous
 Zygophyllum flexuosum Eckl. & Zeyh. accepted as Roepera flexuosa (Eckl. & Zeyh.) Beier & Thulin, endemic
 Zygophyllum foetidum Schrad. & J.C.Wendl. accepted as Roepera foetida (Schrad. & J.C.Wendl.) Beier & Thulin, endemic
 Zygophyllum fulvum L. accepted as Roepera fulva (L.) Beier & Thulin, endemic
 Zygophyllum fuscatum van Zyl, accepted as Roepera fuscata (Van Zyl) Beier & Thulin, endemic
 Zygophyllum garipense E.Mey. accepted as Tetraena microcarpa (Licht. ex Cham.) Beier & Thulin 
 Zygophyllum gilfillanii N.E.Br. accepted as Roepera lichtensteiniana (Cham.) Beier & Thulin, present
 Zygophyllum glaucum E.Mey. ex Sond. indigenous
 Zygophyllum horridum Cham. accepted as Roepera horrida (Cham.) Beier & Thulin, indigenous
 Zygophyllum incanum Schinz, accepted as Tetraena longistipula (Schinz) Beier & Thulin 
 Zygophyllum incrustatum E.Mey. ex Sond. accepted as Roepera incrustata (Sond.) Beier & Thulin, endemic
 Zygophyllum latialatum Engl. accepted as Tetraena rigida (Schinz) Beier & Thulin 
 Zygophyllum leptopetalum E.Mey. ex Sond. accepted as Roepera leptopetala (Sond.) Beier & Thulin, indigenous
 Zygophyllum leucocladum Diels, accepted as Roepera leucoclada (Diels) Beier & Thulin, indigenous
 Zygophyllum lichtensteinianum Cham. & Schltdl. accepted as Roepera lichtensteiniana (Cham.) Beier & Thulin, endemic
 Zygophyllum longicapsulare Schinz, accepted as Tetraena longicapsularis (Schinz) Beier & Thulin, indigenous
 Zygophyllum longistipulatum Schinz, accepted as Tetraena longistipula (Schinz) Beier & Thulin 
 Zygophyllum macrocarpon Retief, accepted as Roepera macrocarpon (Retief) Beier & Thulin, indigenous
 Zygophyllum maculatum Aiton, accepted as Roepera maculata (Aiton) Beier & Thulin, endemic
 Zygophyllum maritimum Eckl. & Zeyh. accepted as Roepera maritima (Eckl. & Zeyh.) Beier & Thulin, endemic
 Zygophyllum maximiliani Schltr. ex Huysst. indigenous
 Zygophyllum meyeri Sond. accepted as Roepera foetida (Schrad. & J.C.Wendl.) Beier & Thulin, present
 Zygophyllum microcarpum Licht. ex Cham. & Schltdl. accepted as Tetraena microcarpa (Licht. ex Cham.) Beier & Thulin, indigenous
 Zygophyllum microphyllum L.f. accepted as Roepera microphyllum (L.f.) Beier & Thulin, indigenous
 Zygophyllum morgsana L. accepted as Roepera morgsana (L.) Beier & Thulin, indigenous
 Zygophyllum paradoxum Schinz, accepted as Roepera cordifolia (L.f.) Beier & Thulin 
 Zygophyllum pfeilii Engl. accepted as Roepera cordifolia (L.f.) Beier & Thulin 
 Zygophyllum prismatocarpum E.Mey. ex Sond. accepted as Tetraena prismatocarpa (Sond.) Beier & Thulin, indigenous
 Zygophyllum procumbens Adamson, accepted as Roepera spinosa (L.) Beier & Thulin, present
 Zygophyllum pterocaule van Zyl, accepted as Tetraena pterocaulis (Van Zyl) Beier & Thulin, indigenous
 Zygophyllum pubescens Schinz, accepted as Roepera pubescens (Schinz) Beier & Thulin, indigenous
 Zygophyllum pygmaeum Eckl. & Zeyh. accepted as Roepera pygmaea (Eckl. & Zeyh.) Beier & Thulin, endemic
 Zygophyllum retrofractum Thunb. accepted as Tetraena retrofracta (Thunb.) Beier & Thulin, indigenous
 Zygophyllum rigidum B.D.Jacks. accepted as Balanites roxburghii Planch. present
 Zygophyllum rigidum Schinz, accepted as Tetraena rigida (Schinz) Beier & Thulin, indigenous
 Zygophyllum rogersii Compton, accepted as Roepera rogersii (Compton) Beier & Thulin, endemic
 Zygophyllum schaeferi Engl. accepted as Roepera cordifolia (L.f.) Beier & Thulin 
 Zygophyllum schreiberanum Merxm. & Giess, accepted as Roepera schreiberi (Merxm. & Giess) Beier & Thulin 
 Zygophyllum sessilifolium L. accepted as Roepera sessilifolia (L.) Beier & Thulin, endemic
 Zygophyllum simplex L. accepted as Tetraena simplex (L.) Beier & Thulin, indigenous
 Zygophyllum sonderi H.Eichler, indigenous
 Zygophyllum sphaerocarpum Schltr. ex Huysst. accepted as Roepera sphaerocarpa (Schltr. ex Huysst.) Beier & Thulin, indigenous
 Zygophyllum spinosum L. accepted as Roepera spinosa (L.) Beier & Thulin, endemic
 Zygophyllum suffruticosum Schinz, accepted as Tetraena rigida (Schinz) Beier & Thulin, present
 Zygophyllum sulcatum Huysst. accepted as Roepera leucoclada (Diels) Beier & Thulin 
 Zygophyllum tenue P.E.Glover, accepted as Tetraena tenuis (Glover) Beier & Thulin, indigenous
 Zygophyllum teretifolium Schltr. accepted as Roepera teretifolia (Schltr.) Beier & Thulin, endemic
 Zygophyllum trothai Diels, accepted as Tetraena rigida (Schinz) Beier & Thulin 
 Zygophyllum uitenhagense Sond. accepted as Roepera maritima (Eckl. & Zeyh.) Beier & Thulin, present

References

South African plant biodiversity lists
Zygophyllales